Kanmon Tunnel may refer to:

Kanmon Railway Tunnel, undersea rail tunnel connecting the islands of Honshu and Kyushu
Kanmon Roadway Tunnel, undersea road tunnel connecting Shimonoseki, Yamaguchi and Moji-ku, Kitakyūshū
Shin-Kanmon Tunnel, undersea rail tunnel connecting Shin-Shimonoseki Station and Kokura Station